Jakub "Kuba" Śmiechowski (born 23 April 1991) is a Polish racing driver currently competing in the FIA World Endurance Championship with Inter Europol Competition.

Racing record

Racing career summary 

† As Śmiechowski was a guest driver, he was ineligible to score points.* Season still in progress.

Complete European Le Mans Series results

Complete FIA World Endurance Championship results
(key) (Races in bold indicate pole position) (Races in italics indicate fastest lap)

* Season still in progress.

References

External links 
 

1991 births
Living people
Polish racing drivers
European Le Mans Series drivers
FIA World Endurance Championship drivers
24 Hours of Le Mans drivers
Asian Le Mans Series drivers
Sportspeople from Warsaw
Italian Formula Renault 2.0 drivers
Formula Renault 2.0 NEC drivers
Formula Renault Eurocup drivers
WeatherTech SportsCar Championship drivers
Austrian Formula Three Championship drivers